Kirsch's Place, also known as the Fireweed Station Lodge, and now the Fireweed Station Inn, is a historic traveler accommodation near Talkeetna, Alaska. It is a -story log structure, built in 1946 by John Kirsch as a residence and guest lodge. Kirsch operated the lodge until his death in 1959. The lodge is a rare survivor of a post-World War II rural building boom, which was later eclipsed as roads and settlement in the area became more prevalent.

The lodge was listed on the National Register of Historic Places in 1998.

See also
National Register of Historic Places listings in Matanuska-Susitna Borough, Alaska

References

External links
Fireweed Station Inn web site

Hotel buildings on the National Register of Historic Places in Alaska
Buildings and structures completed in 1946
Buildings and structures in Matanuska-Susitna Borough, Alaska
Buildings and structures on the National Register of Historic Places in Matanuska-Susitna Borough, Alaska